Z28 was one of fifteen Type 1936A destroyers built for the Kriegsmarine (Germany Navy) during World War II. Built as a flotilla leader with fewer guns than her sister ships, she was completed in 1941. The ship spent most of the first few years of her service in Norwegian waters, escorting convoys and laying minefields. Z28 ran aground in early 1943 and spent the rest of the year under repair. The ship briefly returned to Norway at the beginning of 1944, but was transferred to the Baltic shortly afterwards to support minelaying operations in the Gulf of Finland. That was her primary focus through July and then she began escorting German cruisers as they bombarded Soviet troops ashore in addition to German convoys evacuating people from Finland and the Baltic States.

Z28 also bombarded Soviet positions herself on multiple occasions until she was damaged by bombs during one such mission in October. Her repairs took until February 1945 and, not long afterwards, she was sunk in port by British bombers on 6 March with heavy loss of life.

Design and description
Her crew consisted of 11 officers and 321 sailors.

Z28 carried four 15 cm TbtsK C/36 guns in single mounts with gun shields, two guns each superimposed fore and aft of the superstructure. To accommodate the flotilla commander and his staff, one gun was repositioned from atop the aft superstructure to the upper forward position and the aft superstructure enlarged. Her anti-aircraft armament consisted of four 3.7 cm SK C/30 guns in two twin mounts abreast the rear funnel and six 2 cm C/30 guns in single mounts. The Type 36A ships carried eight above-water  torpedo tubes in two power-operated mounts.  A pair of reload torpedoes was provided for each mount. They had four depth charge launchers and mine rails could be fitted on the rear deck that had a maximum capacity of 60 mines. A system of passive hydrophones designated as 'GHG' (Gruppenhorchgerät) was fitted to detect submarines. A S-Gerät sonar was also probably fitted. The ship was equipped with a FuMO 24/25 radar set above the bridge.

Modifications
During 1942–1943, Z28s anti-aircraft armament was increased to ten each 3.7 cm and 2 cm guns. A FuMO 63 Hohentwiel radar was installed in 1944–1945 in lieu of the aft searchlight.

Service history
Z28 was ordered from AG Weser (Deschimag) on 23 April 1938. The ship was laid down at Deschimag's Bremen shipyard as yard number W962 on 30 November 1939, launched on 20 August 1940, and commissioned on 9 August 1941. Her first commander was Korvettenkapitän (Lieutenant Commander) Hans Erdmenger. While working up from late 1941 to early 1942, she was based in Aarhus, Denmark, and patrolled the Skagerrak and Kattegat.

The ship was transferred to Norway in April where she escorted convoys; with her sister  and a pair of torpedo boats, she escorted the heavy cruiser  and the replenishment oiler Dithmarschen to Narvik on 9 May. Z28 took part in the preliminaries of Operation Rösselsprung, an attempt to intercept Convoy PQ 17 in July. Admiral Scheer and her sister Lützow formed one group in Narvik with Z28 and four of her sisters while the battleship  and Admiral Hipper composed another. While en route to the rendezvous at the Altafjord, Lützow and three destroyers of Tirpitzs escort ran aground, forcing the entire group to abandon the operation. On 1 October, Z28 escorted Admiral Hipper from Altafjord to Bogen Bay and then Tirpitz and Admiral Scheer to Trondheim on the 24th. She continued on to Kiel, Germany, to begin a refit.

In early March 1943, she was one of the escorts of the battleship  on her voyage to Bogen Bay, the only one not to sustain weather damage. While sailing from Altafjord to Harstad with the destroyer  on 2 April, Z28 ran aground. She sailed to Trondheim for repairs and was slightly damaged during an air raid on the docks there on 24 July. The ship then returned to Deschimag's dockyard in Bremen for complete repairs. She was based in Kristiansand, Norway, for anti-contraband patrols from 7 January 1944 and was now assigned to the 6. Zerstörerflotille (6th Destroyer Flotilla). On 12–13 February, Z28 and two other destroyers from the flotilla laid a minefield in the Skagerrak. Shortly afterwards, the 6th Flotilla was transferred to the Gulf of Finland to support minelaying operations there, Z28 arriving at Reval, Estonia, on 21 February. The flotilla was initially tasked to escort convoys between Libau, Latvia, and Reval, but laid its first minefield in Narva Bay on 12 March while bombarding Soviet positions on the eastern shore of the bay. They were primarily tasked as minelayers through July. In preparation for Operation Tanne West, the occupation of Åland in case of Finnish surrender, the flotilla escorted Lützow to the island of Utö on 28 June, but the operation was canceled and the ships returned to port.

On 30 July and 1 August Z28 and three other destroyers of the flotilla sailed into the Gulf of Riga to bombard Soviet positions inland. On 5 August, they escorted the heavy cruiser  as she engaged targets on the island of Oesel, Estonia, and in Latvia on 19–20 August. Z28 and the destroyer  escorted the troopship MV Monte Rosa, laden with refugees, from Baltischport, Estonia, to Gotenhafen, Germany, on 16 September. Four days later, the ship helped to evacuate 23,172 people from Reval in the face of the advancing Soviets. The following day, the ship, together with the destroyer , ferried 370 people from Baltischport to Libau. On 22 August, she escorted ships loaded with evacuees from the Sea of Åland to Gotenhafen. Z28 resumed her shore bombardment missions on 10 October, attacking targets at Memel on that date and the 23rd. She engaged Soviet positions in Sworbe, on the Estonian island of Saaremaa, on the 22nd and 24th. During the latter mission, she was damaged by Soviet aircraft, killing nine crewmen and wounding many others, and sailed for Swinemünde for repairs. They were completed on 25 February 1945 and Z28 escorted the ocean liner  from Gotenhafen to Sassnitz two days later as it evacuated Germans from the Polish Corridor as part of Operation Hannibal. After repeating the mission on 4 March, the ship was sunk with heavy casualties in the latter port two days later by the Royal Air Force after being hit by two bombs amidships.

Notes

References

External links
 Kriegsmarine destroyers

1940 ships
Ships built in Bremen (state)
Type 1936A-class destroyers
Maritime incidents in March 1945
World War II shipwrecks in the Baltic Sea
Destroyers sunk by aircraft
Ships sunk by British aircraft